Sergio Mimica-Gezzan (also known as Srđan Mimica; born May 2, 1956) is a Croatian-born American film and television director. He is the son of famous Croatian film director Vatroslav Mimica. He has received three Directors Guild of America awards for his work as an assistant director and is now a regular lead director in episodic television. He has often worked with Steven Spielberg as an assistant director. He directed six episodes of the reimagined Battlestar Galactica, two episodes of Heroes, two episodes of Raised by Wolves, three episodes of The Terror, and all eight episodes of The Pillars of the Earth, the television adaptation of Ken Follett's novel of the same name.

Mimica-Gezzan's other television credits include Invasion, Prison Break, Saving Grace, Terminator: The Sarah Connor Chronicles and Falling Skies. In 2014 he directed the Halo: Nightfall digital feature.

As a boy and a young man he appeared as an actor in his father's most well-known films Ponedjeljak ili utorak (1966) and Događaj (1969). He is best known for his leading role in the 1975 Croatian film Anno Domini 1573, directed by his father Vatroslav.

Footnotes

External links
 

1956 births
Living people
21st-century Croatian people
American film directors
Yugoslav emigrants to the United States
American television directors